Glipa asahinai is a species of beetle in the genus Glipa. It was described in 1950.

References

asahinai
Beetles described in 1950